Qeshlaq-e Seyf Khanlu may refer to:
 Qeshlaq-e Seyf Khanlu 1
 Qeshlaq-e Seyf Khanlu 2